Anders Odden (born 20 December 1972) is a Norwegian musician. He is the co-founder and guitarist of the Norwegian death metal band Cadaver (1988–1993; 1999–present), and is the bass player for Norwegian black metal band Satyricon (2009–present). He is founder and guitarist of the old school black metal band ORDER and the industrial rock band Magenta. He played live guitar for Celtic Frost (2006–2007) and has had several guest appearances with bands such as The Young Gods and Ministry, among others.

Personal life
Anders was born in Stavanger. He moved to Fredrikstad and then to Råde sometime during his childhood, where he grew up without any TV and listened to his father's collection of classical music. He was unaware of rock music until the age of 7 when he discovered Kiss and devoted his life to music.

Music career
Anders Odden started out as a black metal musician and artist in the mid 80s, and went on to start one of Norway's first death metal bands, Cadaver, in 1988. He formed Magenta in 1995 as an outlet for other musical ideas than death metal. Celtic Frost recruited him as their live guitarist in 2006. He toured Europe, USA, Canada and Japan with them on their Monotheist Tour, which ended in 2007. After Celtic Frost he co-founded metal super group Doctor Midnight & The Mercy Cult that lasted between 2009 and 2011. He had by then joined Satyricon as their temp live bass player in 2009, but moved on to hold this position permanently from 2013. He performed on "Live at the Opera" DVD/CD/LP with Satyricon released 2015 and is currently involved with the band's coming album TBA 2017. In 2013 he founded the old school back metal band ORDER together with Manheim (ex-Mayhem), Messiah (ex-Mayhem) and Rene Jansen (ex-Cadaver). When Rene Jansen died 3 December 2014 ORDER decided to continue. They recruited Stu Manx (ex-Gluecifer) in August 2015 and released their debut demo tape, "Folly Grandeur", in April 2016.

Throughout the 1990s and 2000s, Odden worked as a consultant for music organizations in Norway, such as RIO, GramArt, MIC and MFO (Musicians Union in Norway). He is the founder of music business seminar IMC, which is held during the annual Inferno Festival in Oslo, Norway. In 2011 he released his autobiography, "Piratliv", on Jurtizen Forlag which received great reviews in Norwegian media.

Discography
Cadaver
Hallucinating Anxiety, Necrosis/Earache (1990)
...In Pains, Earache (1992)
Primal, (EP, 1999)
Discipline, Earache (2001)
Live Inferno (konsertalbum, 2002)
Necrosis, Candlelight (2004)
D.G.A.F., Nuclear Blast (2020)
Edder & Bile, Nuclear Blast (2020)

Magenta
Magenta, (EP) AT&MT (1997)
One Mind, (single) 1998 RapaxPRod/Tatra (1998)
Periode, RapxProd/Tatra (1998)
All Over, (single) Re:pop (2002)
Little Girl Lost, Re:pop (2002)
Art and Accidents, AT&MT (2009)
Magenta Aus Norwegen, AT&MT (2012)
Songs for the Dead, Cleopatra Records (2015)

Satyricon
Megiddo, Moonfog (EP, 1997)
Rebel Extravaganza, Moonfog (1999)
Live at the Opera, Napalm Records (2015)
Deep Calleth Upon Deep, Napalm Records (2017)

Doctor Midnight & The Mercy Cult
(Don't) Waste It, (single) Season of Mist (2011)
I declare: Treason, Season of Mist (2011)

ORDER
Folly Grandeur, (demo tape) ORDER (2016)
Lex Amentiae, Listenable Records (2017)
The Gospel, Listenable Records (2021)

Bands/instruments
 Deadly Metal – 1985 – guitars
 Slaught – 1986–1987 – guitars
 FOAD – 1986 – guitars, bass, vocals, drums
 Asmodeus – 1987 – guitars, bass, vocals, drums
 Baphomet – 1987–1988 – guitars
 Monument – 1988 – guitars
 Cadaver – 1988–1993, 2003–present – guitars
 Braindead – 1988 – drums
 Balvaz – 1989 – drums
 Hydr-Hydr – 1990–1991 – drums
 Nesten Døde – 1989–1991 – drums
 Thy Abhorrent – 1991 – live guitars
 Apoptygma Berzerk – 1992–1999, 2003–2006 – guitars
 The Young Gods – 1992, 1995 – live guitars
 Jemotor 1 – 1993–1995 – guitars
 Magenta – 1995–present – guitars, bass, keyboard, vocals
 Satyricon – 1997–1999 – session recording guitars, 2009–present – bass
 Cadaver Inc – 1999–2002 – guitars
 Mayhem – 2000 – programming
 Celtic Frost – 2006–2007 – live guitars
 Pigface – 2009 – guitars
 Ministry – 2008 – live guitars
 Doctor Midnight & The Mercy Cult – 2009–2011 – guitars
 ORDER – 2013–present – guitars

References

1972 births
Living people
Musicians from Stavanger
Norwegian black metal musicians
Norwegian multi-instrumentalists
Death metal musicians
Satyricon (band) members
Celtic Frost members
Pigface members
Cadaver (band) members
Doctor Midnight & The Mercy Cult members